Utricularia quelchii is a small perennial, epiphyte or terrestrial carnivorous plant that belongs to the genus Utricularia. U. quelchii is endemic to the Guyana Highland region of Guyana and Venezuela with one collection from Brazil. It was originally published and described by N. E. Brown in 1901. It grows on wet, mossy rocks or banks in swamps and around low tree trunks and branches and sometimes in the water-filled leaf axils of the bromeliad Brocchinia species.

See also 

 List of Utricularia species

References 

Carnivorous plants of South America
Epiphytes
Flora of Brazil
Flora of Guyana
Flora of Venezuela
quelchii
Taxa named by N. E. Brown